Chlorella sorokiniana is a species of freshwater green microalga in the Division Chlorophyta. It has a characteristic emerald-green color and pleasant grass odor. Its cells divide rapidly to produce four new cells every 17 to 24 hours. The alga was described by Martinus W. Beijerinck in 1890. In 1951, the Rockefeller Foundation in collaboration with the Japanese Government and Hiroshi Tamiya developed the technology to grow, harvest and process Chlorella sorokiniana on a large, economically feasible scale. This microalga has also been used extensively as a model system to study enzymes involved in higher plant metabolism.

Also, Chlorella sorokiniana is used to research ways to improve biofuel efficiency.

Chlorella sorokiniana is often used as a food supplement or to treat waste water.

References

sorokiniana